William R. Wooton (born September 20, 1944) is an American attorney and politician who has served as a justice of the Supreme Court of Appeals of West Virginia since January 1, 2021.

Education 
Wooton received his Bachelor of Arts in business management from Marshall University and his Juris Doctor from the West Virginia University College of Law, where he was editor-in-Chief of the West Virginia Law Review, Order of the Coif, and graduated at the top of his class.

Political career

House of Delegates 
Wooton was a member of the West Virginia House of Delegates representing District 27 from 1978 to 1986, 1988 to 1990, and 2008 to 2010. He served as House Majority Leader from 1985 to 1986.

Senate 
Wooton served in the West Virginia Senate from 1991 through 2002 and also served as the Chairman of the Senate Judiciary Committee. Wooton was also an unsuccessful candidate to return to the Senate in 2018.

Legal career 

Wooton was a law clerk for the Honorable John A. Field, Jr., Judge, United States Court of Appeals for the Fourth Circuit from 1971 to 1972; an assistant West Virginia Attorney General from 1972 to 74; and an Assistant Raleigh County Prosecutor from 1974 to 1977. He practiced law in Beckley with the firm Wooton, Wooton & Fragile from 1977 until 1994; with The Wooton Law Firm from 1994 until 2014; and with Wooton & Wooton, Attorneys at Law, from 2014 through 2020.

Justice of the Supreme Court of Appeals of West Virginia 
Wooton was elected to a 12 year term in a nonpartisan election to the Supreme Court of Appeals on June 9, 2020, and began his term on January 1, 2021. He was an unsuccessful candidate for the Court in 2016, losing to future colleague Beth Walker.

Personal life 
Wooton served in the West Virginia Army National Guard and the United States Army Reserve, reaching the rank of colonel.

He is married to his wife, Shir, and they have three adult sons and five grandchildren.

References 

1944 births
Living people
20th-century American lawyers
20th-century American politicians
21st-century American judges
21st-century American lawyers
21st-century American politicians
American prosecutors
Justices of the Supreme Court of Appeals of West Virginia
Marshall University alumni
Democratic Party members of the West Virginia House of Delegates
Lawyers from Beckley, West Virginia
West Virginia lawyers
Democratic Party West Virginia state senators
West Virginia University College of Law alumni
Politicians from Beckley, West Virginia